The Attorney General of Uganda is the principal legal adviser to the government of Uganda. The office of the attorney general, is a cabinet-level government position in the country. The incumbent, Kiryowa Kiwanuka,  was appointed on 8 June 2021.

Overview
In the past, the office of the attorney general was combined with the Ministry of Justice and Constitutional Affairs (Uganda), with one cabinet minister serving both functions. Later, the two portfolios were de-coupled and two separate cabinet ministers were appointed.

Attorneys General of Uganda (since 1962)
 Kiryowa Kiwanuka: 2021 -
 William Byaruhanga:  2016 - 2021
 Fred Ruhindi: 2015 until 2016
 Peter Nyombi: 2011 until 2015
 Kiddu Makubuya: 2005 until 2011
 Amama Mbabazi: 2004 to 2006 
 Francis Ayume: 2001 to 2004
Bart Magunda Katureebe: 1996 to 2001 
 Joseph Kalias Ekemu: 1994 to 1996 
Abu Mayanja: 1991 to 1994  
 George William Kanyeihamba: 1988 to 1991  
 Joseph Mulenga: 1986 to 1988 
 Sam Kutesa: 1985 to 1986 
 Stephen Amoding Ariko: 1979 to 1985 
 George William Kanyeihamba: 1979  
 Mathia Bazitya Matovu: 1977 to 1979 
 Godfrey Lule: 1974 to 1977 
 Peter James Nkambo Mugerwa: 1971 to 1974 
 Lameck Lubowa: 1967 to 1971 
 Godfrey Binaisa: 1962 to 1967

Attorneys General of Uganda (prior to independence in 1962)
Ralph Leonard Emmanuel Dreschfield: 1951 to 1962
Sir Guy Wilmot McLintock Henderson: 1948 to 1951
James Reali Gregg: 1943 to 1947
 Major-General Sir Ralph Hone: 1937 to 1943
Neville Harry Turton: 1933 to 1936
Sir Kenneth Elliston Poyser: 1928 to 1933
 Sir Sidney Solomon Abrahams: 1925 to 1928
 Hon. Alan Frederick Hogg: 1918 to 1924
Sir Donald Kingdon: 1912 to 1918
Sir Alison Russell: 1906 to 1912

See also
 Attorney general
 Politics of Uganda
 Cabinet of Uganda

References

Government agencies of Uganda
Government ministries of Uganda
Government of Uganda